Heorhiy Viktorovych Sudakov (born 1 September 2002) is a Ukrainian professional footballer who plays as a midfielder for FC Shakhtar Donetsk in the Ukrainian Premier League.

Club career
Sudakov is a product of the different youth sportive schools, who in 2017 joined the FC Shakhtar Donetsk Academy in the Ukrainian Premier League in 2020.

He played in the Ukrainian Premier League Reserves and made his debut for Shakhtar Donetsk in the 2020–21 UEFA Champions League in a winning away match against Real Madrid on 21 October 2020.

International career
Sudakov made his debut for Ukraine national team on 23 May 2021 in a friendly against Bahrain.

Career statistics

References

External links
 
 
 

2002 births
Living people
People from Brianka
Ukrainian footballers
FC Shakhtar Donetsk players
Association football midfielders
Ukrainian Premier League players
Ukraine youth international footballers
Ukraine under-21 international footballers
Ukraine international footballers
UEFA Euro 2020 players
Sportspeople from Luhansk Oblast